The Kesterson National Wildlife Refuge was an artificial wetland environment, created using agricultural runoff from farmland in California's Central Valley.

The irrigation water is transported to the valley from sources in the Sierra Nevada via the California Aqueduct.  Minerals from these sources are carried in the water and concentrated by evaporation from aqueducts, canals, and fields. This has resulted in an exceptionally high accumulation of selenium and other minerals in the wetlands.  Wildlife in this region suffered deformities due to selenium poisoning, drawing the attention of news media and leading to the closure of the refuge.

Kesterson Reservoir was a unit of the refuge but is now part of San Luis National Wildlife Refuge.

Westlands-Kesterson Timeline 

 1952 - Westlands Water District is formed and would become the nation's largest Water district covering 600,000 acres
 1961 - United States Bureau of Reclamation (USBR) agrees to build San Luis Reservoir and a runoff drain that would benefit the Westlands 
 1975 - Funding for the Westlands drain cut by congress resulting in toxic run-off diverted to Kesterson National Wildlife Refuge evaporation ponds
 1977 Nov 5 - 529 page federal report says USBR has failed to breakup corporate ownership in Westlands over 160 acre limit
 1978 - 7,000 acre feet of toxic water laced with Selenium and pesticides sent annually to Kesterson evaporation ponds flows into wildlife reserve
 1983 - 60% of baby birds are deformed within Kesterson National Wildlife Refuge where contaminated water is sent
 1985 - Tragedy at Kesterson Reservoir: Death of a Wildlife Refuge Illustrates Failings of Water Law
 1996 - USBR and State forms Grasslands Bypass Project to divert contaminated water from going into Kesterson
 2000 Mar 1 - Court of Appeals orders USBR to construct CVP Drain  
 Jun 9 - $450 million water plan proposed by Governor Davis includes raising Shasta dam height
 2002 Feb 13 - Natural Resources Defense Council appeals Judge's ruling over how much CVP water can be retained for wildlife
 Nov 17 - USBR close to making deal to buy contaminated lands in Westlands
 2004 Apr 22 - Sac Express The Rich get wetter
 Jul 14 - Court order allows for protection of fish in Trinity River with water
 Sep 14 - EWG Less Land, More Water Soaking Uncle Sam
 2007 Aug 30 - Cal fishing community says Westlands Wants to Raise Shasta Dam And Grab $40 Billion in Subsidized Water
 2009 Jun 10 - TJA CVP pumping changes to protect fish
 2012 Mar 2 - Court of Appeals ends thirteen year legal battle between Westlands and Interior Dept in government's favor
 2017 Mar 17 - San Luis Unit Drainage Resolution Act (H.R.1769) proposed to deal with Kesterson drainage 
 May 18 - Ex-Westlands Water District lobbyist picked for key Dept. of Interior post
 Nov 10 - USBR and Westlands Water District settlement in limbo
 2018 Jan 23 - Deadline passes but Westlands confident of help from Congress
 May 3 - Billions at play over Kesterson impacts and the growing pressure to accept deal from Westland's big farmers
 2019 May 1 - USBR-Westlands drainage deal for CVP water: Whose who and what's involved
 May 23 - Congressional Research Service releases new report on the CVP and legislative proposals
 Sept 6 - Environmentalists win Appeals Court Victory against San Joaquin Valley Agricultural Polluters
 Nov 15 - Interior Secretary David Bernhardt, who was the former lawyer for Westlands proposes permanent CVP water contract

See also

Selenium pollution

References

External links
Environmental Encyclopedia
San Luis Drain

National Wildlife Refuges in California
Protected areas of Merced County, California
Wetlands of California
Disasters in California
Environmental disasters in the United States
Constructed wetlands
Environmental issues in California
Landforms of Merced County, California